Juan Arroyo may refer to:
Juan Arroyo (bishop) (died 1656), Spanish Roman Catholic bishop
Juan Arroyo (cyclist) (born 1955), Venezuelan cyclist